Alexander Nilsson (born 11 December 1990) is a Swedish footballer who most recently played for IF Brommapojkarna in Allsvenskan.

References

External links 
 
 Alexander Nilsson at Fotbolltransfers

Swedish footballers
Allsvenskan players
Superettan players
1990 births
Living people
IK Frej players
Assyriska FF players
IK Sirius Fotboll players
IF Brommapojkarna players
Footballers from Malmö
Association football wingers